Čisovice is a municipality and village in Prague-West District in the Central Bohemian Region of the Czech Republic. It has about 1,100 inhabitants.

Administrative parts
The village of Bojov is an administrative part of Čisovice.

Notable people
Zdeněk Kudrna (1946–1982), speedway rider

References

Villages in Prague-West District